Big Ben Bolt is a comic strip that was syndicated from February 20, 1950 to April 15, 1978. It was drawn by John Cullen Murphy, written by Elliot Caplin, and distributed by King Features Syndicate. The strip followed the adventures of boxer and journalist Ben Bolt.

Publication history 

In 1950, writer Elliot Caplin (brother of Li'l Abner cartoonist Al Capp) suggested that Murphy illustrate a boxing comic strip he had in mind. 
Comics historian Don Markstein wrote:

Murphy was the artist of Big Ben Bolt from 1950 to 1977. He occasionally used assistants, including Al Williamson (Flash Gordon), Alex Kotzky (Apartment 3-G), Neal Adams (Deadman), John Celardo (Tarzan) and Stan Drake (The Heart of Juliet Jones). In 1971, Murphy took over Prince Valiant, and Carlos Garzon became a regular inker. Eventually Murphy left the strip, and Joe Kubert stepped in to draw Big Ben Bolt, followed by Gray Morrow who eventually signed the strip starting August 1, 1977. He was followed by Neal Adams. Big Ben Bolt ended on April 15, 1978.

King Features' email service, DailyINK, began carrying Big Ben Bolt in June 2010.

Characters and story
As Markstein writes,

Awards
Murphy received the National Cartoonists Society's Award for Story Comic Strip for 1971 for his work on Big Ben Bolt and Prince Valiant.

References

Further reading
Strickler, Dave. Syndicated Comic Strips and Artists, 1924-1995: The Complete Index. Cambria, California: Comics Access, 1995. 

American comic strips
1950 comics debuts
1978 comics endings
Boxing comics
Drama comics
Fictional boxers
Fictional reporters
Comics characters introduced in 1950
American comics characters